Robert Fraser (born 13 February 1954) is an Australian cricketer. He played seven first-class matches for South Australia between 1974 and 1979.

See also
 List of South Australian representative cricketers

References

External links
 

1954 births
Living people
Australian cricketers
South Australia cricketers
Cricketers from Adelaide